Sultanpur Jala is a village in Dalmau block of Rae Bareli district, Uttar Pradesh, India. As of 2011, it has a population of 839 people, in 157 households. It has one primary school and no healthcare facilities.

The 1961 census recorded Sultanpur Jala as comprising 2 hamlets, with a total population of 287 people (144 male and 143 female), in 50 households and 46 physical houses. The area of the village was given as 297 acres.

The 1981 census recorded Sultanpur Jala as having a population of 474 people, in 82 households, and having an area of 121.82 hectares. The main staple foods were listed as wheat and rice.

References

Villages in Raebareli district